Boris Becker was the defending champion but lost in the quarterfinals to Tim Mayotte.

Mayotte won in the final 6–4, 2–1 after Jimmy Connors was forced to retire.

Seeds

  Jimmy Connors (final)
  Boris Becker (quarterfinals)
  Stefan Edberg (semifinals)
  Anders Järryd (first round)
  Kevin Curren (second round)
  Brad Gilbert (second round)
  Paul Annacone (quarterfinals)
  Tim Mayotte (champion)
  Johan Kriek (withdrew)
  David Pate (third round)
  Matt Anger (first round)
  Tim Wilkison (quarterfinals)
  Slobodan Živojinović (second round)
  Paul McNamee (third round)
  Andreas Maurer (first round)
  Guy Forget (third round)

Draw

Finals

Top half

Section 1

Section 2

Bottom half

Section 3

Section 4

External links
 1986 Stella Artois Championships draw

Singles